Oregon Route 42 (OR 42) is an Oregon state highway which runs between U.S. Route 101 on the Oregon Coast, near Coos Bay, and Green, a few miles south of Roseburg on Interstate 5.  OR 42 traverses the Coos Bay–Roseburg Highway No. 35 of the Oregon state highway system. The route splits at Coquille, where Oregon Route 42S heads southwest toward Bandon.

The section of Oregon Route 42 between the junction with U.S. Route 101 south of Coos Bay and the junction with Oregon Route 42S in Coquille was once a part of U.S. Route 101.  When U.S. Route 101 was moved to an alignment closer to the ocean in 1961-63, Oregon Route 42 was extended along the northernmost section and Oregon Route 42S was created along the southernmost section.

Route description
OR 42 is known internally by the Oregon Department of Transportation (ODOT) as the Coos Bay-Roseburg Highway No. 35. The entire highway is designated as part of the National Highway System, which includes roadways important to the national economy, defense, and mobility. The entire highway has also been designated as a freight route by ODOT.

History

Coos and Douglas counties began lobbying the state government for major widening and straightening of OR 42 in the late 1940s due to unsafe conditions and heavy use. A group of 140 women from the area appealed directly to the Oregon State Highway Commission in 1957 for improvements, but were turned away.

Oregon 42 was extended west in 1961-63 due to a realignment of US 101.

2015 landslide

On December 23, 2015, a large landslide on a  section of OR 42 near the Coos–Douglas county line closed the highway to traffic. The section of highway was undergoing part of a $11 million realignment project to straighten the roadway; the area above the slide was clear-cut as part of construction.

Major intersections

Spur route

Oregon Route 42S is an Oregon state highway which is located entirely within Coos County. It runs between U.S. Route 101 at Bandon and Coquille on Oregon Route 42. It is known as the Coquille-Bandon Highway No. 244 (see Oregon highways and routes). It serves as an important link between Interstate 5 and the southern Oregon Coast, as it forms the southernmost all-season connection between the two in Oregon.  Oregon Route 42S used to be a part of U.S. Route 101, and was created when US 101 was realigned closer to the ocean in 1961-63.

References

External links

OR 42 at ORoads
OR 42S at ORoads

042
Transportation in Coos County, Oregon
Transportation in Douglas County, Oregon